Cvek is a Croatian and Slovenian occupational surname for a shoemaker ( from  with the meaning "nail", "tack", "thumbtack", "shoe tack") and may refer to:
 George Joseph Cvek (1918–1942), American murderer and serial rapist
 Lovro Cvek (born 1995), Croatian footballer
 Matija Cvek (born 1993), Croatian singer-songwriter
 Robert Cvek (born 1979), Czech chess player
 Rudolf Cvek (1946–2005), Croatian footballer

Croatian surnames
Slovene-language surnames